Moradlu may refer to various places in Iran:
 Moradlu, Bileh Savar, Ardabil Province
 Moradlu, Meshgin Shahr, Ardabil Province
 Moradlu, Hurand, East Azerbaijan Province
 Moradlu, Khoda Afarin, East Azerbaijan Province
 Moradlu-ye Olya, West Azerbaijan Province
 Moradlu-ye Sofla, West Azerbaijan Province
 Moradlu-ye Vosta, West Azerbaijan Province
 Moradlu District, in Meshgin Shahr County, Ardabil Province